The 1985 Paine Webber Classic was a men's tennis tournament played on outdoor hard courts in Fort Myers, Florida in the United States that was part of the 1985 Nabisco Grand Prix. It was the inaugural edition of the tournament and was held from March 25 through April 1, 1985. Second-seeded Ivan Lendl won the singles title.

Prize money

*per team

Finals

Singles

 Ivan Lendl defeated  Jimmy Connors 6–3, 6–2
 It was Lendl's 1st singles title of the year and the 43rd of his career.

Doubles

 Ken Flach /  Robert Seguso defeated  Sammy Giammalva Jr. /  David Pate 3–6, 6–3, 6–3
 It was Flach's 2nd title of the year and the 8th of his career. It was Seguso's 2nd title of the year and the 8th of his career.

See also
 Connors–Lendl rivalry

References

External links
 ITF tournament edition details

 
Paine Webber Classic
Verizon Tennis Challenge
1985 in American tennis
Tennis tournaments in Florida
1985 in sports in Florida